Andrew Weitz is an American fashion stylist. He previously worked as a talent agent at William Morris Endeavor.

Career
Weitz is originally from Philadelphia, Pennsylvania. He majored in communications at George Washington University and then moved to Los Angeles, where his brother, Richard Weitz, was working as a talent agent at ICM. Weitz joined ICM and when Richard left to work at Endeavor, Weitz joined him. As an agent, Weitz represented a number of British actors and comedians, including Ricky Gervais, James Corden, Stephen Merchant, Claire Foy and Russell Tovey. As a talent agent, he was named one of the best-dressed agents in the film business by The Hollywood Reporter and named as one of the Top 50 Best Dressed Men in the World by British GQ.

In 2014, Weitz left WME to work as a style consultant, founding the company The Weitz Effect.  His clients, who are mostly male, include Elon Musk, Ari Emanuel, and Tom Brady. Weitz was named The Power Stylist, 2021 by The Hollywood Reporter.

Weitz is a member of the British Fashion Council and the Mr Porter Style Council. He is also the contributing men’s style editor for The Hollywood Reporter.

Personal life
He is married to Stacy, a senior executive at Sony Pictures Television. He lives in Los Angeles with his wife and their twin sons.

References

External links
The Weitz Effect

Fashion stylists
American talent agents

Year of birth missing (living people)
Living people